Rachel Mercer (born 28 March 1989) is a road cyclist from New Zealand. She represented her nation at the 2009 UCI Road World Championships.

References

External links
 profile at Procyclingstats.com

1989 births
New Zealand female cyclists
Living people
Place of birth missing (living people)